Hematopoietically-expressed homeobox protein HHEX is a protein that in humans is encoded by the HHEX gene and also known as Proline Rich Homeodomain protein PRH.

This gene encodes a member of the homeobox family of transcription factors, many of which are involved in developmental processes. Expression in specific hematopoietic lineages suggests that this protein may play a role in hematopoietic differentiation but the expression of this protein is not limited to hematopoietic cells.

Function 

The HHEX transcription factor acts as a activator of transcription in some instances and a repressor of transcription others. It interacts with a number of other signaling molecules to play an important role in the development of multiple organs, such as the liver, thyroid and forebrain. HHEX serves to repress VEGFA, another protein which is important in endothelial cell development. SCL, a significant transcription factor for blood and endothelial cell differentiation, is shown to interact with HHEX to promote the correct development of the hematopoiesis process. HHEX appears to work together with another molecule, β-catenin, for the development of the anterior organizer. It also contributes to developmental remodeling and stabilization of endothelial cells in an unborn organism. The importance of this transcription factor is illustrated by the inability of HHEX knockout mice embryos to survive gestation. Without the expression of HHEX, these mice embryos die in utero between Day 13 and Day 16. HHEX knockout mice display a range of abnormalities including forebrain abnormalities in various levels of severity, as well as a number of other defects including heart, vasculature, liver, monocyte, and thyroid abnormalities. The HHEX protein is important in a variety of cancers and it can act as an tumour suppressor protein or as an oncoprotein depending on the cancer type.

Interactions 

HHEX has been shown to interact with Promyelocytic leukemia protein.

References

Further reading

External links 
 

Transcription factors